Ann Reed Mangels is a registered dietitian and Adjunct Associate Professor in the Department of Nutrition in the School of Public Health and Health Sciences at the University of Massachusetts Amherst, specializing in vegan and vegetarian nutrition. She is the author or co-author of numerous papers and books on the subject, including the American Dietetic Association's position paper on vegan and vegetarian diets, Vegan & Vegetarian FAQ (2001), The Dietitian's Guide to Vegetarian Diets (2004), and The Everything Vegan Pregnancy Book (2011).

Mangels is nutrition adviser for the Vegetarian Resource Group, and nutrition editor for Vegetarian Journal.



Selected works
Books
The Everything Vegan Pregnancy Book. Adams Media, 2011.
with Virginia Messina and Mark Messina. The Dietitian's Guide to Vegetarian Diets: Issues and Applications. 3rd ed. Jones and Bartlett, 2010.
with Debra Wasserman. Simply Vegan: Quick Vegetarian Meals. Vegetarian Resource Group, 2006.
with David Gypsy Breier. Vegan & Vegetarian FAQ. Vegetarian Resource Group, 2001.

Papers/book chapters

Notes

Further reading
"Reed Mangels", Vegetarian Times, February 1993.

21st-century American women scientists
American Jews
American vegetarianism activists
American women academics
American women writers
Case Western Reserve University alumni
Dietitians
Living people
Ohio articles needing attention
University of Massachusetts Amherst faculty
University System of Maryland alumni
Year of birth missing (living people)
Vegetarian cookbook writers